Sadiq Shaheed Stadium is a football arena in Quetta, Pakistan. In 2011, Pakistan Premier League fixtures played here regularly attracted around 5000 spectators.

An assortment of dangerous situations have occurred at or near this arena, one being a hazardous bomb that combusted and injured an innocent passerby back in 2012. Along with that explosion, a lethal suicide attack on JUI-F chief Fazal-ur-Rehman while in his armored-embedded jeep just leaving the Sadiq Shaheed Stadium that resulted in at least one person confirmed dead and 22 Pakistanis injured(unknown if critical). Nevertheless, he wasn't injured.

Marking the 42nd death remembrance anniversary of the Pashtunkhwa Milli Awami Party leader Mahmood Khan Achakzai's father Abdul Samad Khan Achakzai a gathering was held at Sadiq Shaheed Stadium.

References

Sports venues in Pakistan
Football venues in Pakistan